Thomas Joseph McCarthy (September 27, 1885 – December 18, 1943) was an American lyricist whose most famous songs include "You Made Me Love You", and "I'm Always Chasing Rainbows", from the now-forgotten Oh, Look! (1918), starring the Dolly Sisters, based upon the haunting melody from the middle section of Chopin's Fantaisie-Impromptu.

Born in Somerville, Massachusetts, United States, McCarthy was a frequent collaborator of composers Harry Tierney and Fred Fisher. He was the director of ASCAP from 1921 to 1929.

Broadway and film credits

Music score
1918 Oh, Look!
1919 Ziegfeld Follies of 1919
1919 Irene (stage musical)
1920 Ziegfeld Follies of 1920
1921 The Broadway Whirl
1922 Up She Goes
1922 Glory
1923 Ziegfeld Follies of 1923
1923 Kid Boots
1924 Ziegfeld Follies of 1924
1926 Irene (film)
1927 Rio Rita (stage musical)
1928 Cross My Heart
1929 Rio Rita
1930 New Movietone Follies of 1930
1931 Ziegfeld Follies of 1931
1942 Rio Rita (remake)

Songwriter
1914 "There's a Little Spark of Love Still Burning" (with Fred Fisher)
1917 "They Go Wild Simply Wild Over Me" (with Fred Fisher)
1918 "I'm Always Chasing Rainbows" (from the musical Oh Look!)
1919 "Alice Blue Gown" (waltz from Irene) (with Harry Tierney)
1930 "So This Is London"
1930 "Under Suspicion"
1930 "Up the River"
1945 "Incendiary Blonde"

References

External links

Joseph McCarthy on IBDB

 Joseph McCarthy recordings at the Discography of American Historical Recordings.

1885 births
1943 deaths
People from Somerville, Massachusetts
Musicians from Massachusetts
Songwriters from Massachusetts